Cophixalus tagulensis is a species of frog in the family Microhylidae. It is endemic to Papua New Guinea and only known from the Tagula Island in the Louisiade Archipelago, east of New Guinea. It is only known from the type series of three specimens collected in 1956.

Description
The holotype, an adult male, measured  in snout–vent length. The unsexed paratypes measured  SVL. The snout is blunt. The tympanum is not visible. The skin is smooth both dorsally and ventrally. The fingers and toes have small discs, those of fingers being smaller than those of toes. The fingers and toes have lateral fringes; the toes are in addition about one-half webbed.

Habitat and conservation
Its natural habitat is tropical moist lowland forests. No significant threats are known; the forests on Tagula were logged about 100 years ago but have since recovered.

References

tagulensis
Amphibians of Papua New Guinea
Endemic fauna of Papua New Guinea
Amphibians described in 1963
Taxa named by Richard G. Zweifel
Taxonomy articles created by Polbot